Poundstock is an electoral division of Cornwall in the United Kingdom and returns one member to sit on Cornwall Council. The current Councillor is Nicky Chopak, a Liberal Democrat.

Councillors

2009-2021

2021-present

Extent

2009-2021
Poundstock represented the villages of Crackington Haven, Widemouth Bay, Marhamchurch, Week St Mary, Jacobstow, Whitstone and North Tamerton, and the hamlets of Pencuke, Rosecare, St Gennys, Coxford, Wainhouse Corner, Trewint, Tregole, Treskinnick Cross, Poundstock, Box's Shop, Titson and Broad Langdon. The hamlets of Canworthy Water and Tresparrett Posts were shared with the Tintagel division. The division was affected by boundary changes at the 2013 election. From 2009 to 2013, the division covered 12,419 hectares; from 2013 to its abolition in 2021, the division covered 13,516 hectares.

2021-present
The current division, created from the 2021 boundary changes (when the Council went from 123 seats to 87), represents the villages of Crackington Haven, Widemouth Bay, Marhamchurch, Week St Mary, Jacobstow, Whitstone, North Tamerton and Grimscott, and the hamlets of St Gennys, Pencuke, Rosecare, Coxford, Wainhouse Corner, Trewint, Tregole, Treskinnick Cross, Poundstock, Box's Shop, Titson, Broad Langdon, Red Post and Hersham. The hamlet of Tresparrett Posts is shared with the Camelford and Boscastle division and the division also covers a small part of the edge of the town of Stratton.

Election results

2021 election

2017 election

2013 election

2009 election

References

Electoral divisions of Cornwall Council